
Blyton may refer to:

As a place
 Blyton, a village and civil parish in Lincolnshire, England
 Blyton, Illinois, an unincorporated community in Illinois, United States

As a surname
 Billy Blyton, Baron Blyton (1899–1977), a British Labour Party politician
 Carey Blyton (1932–2002), a British composer and writer
 Enid Blyton (1897–1968), a British children's author

Other
 RAF Blyton, an airfield in Lincolnshire, England